The J. B. Speed School of Engineering was founded in 1925 as part of the University of Louisville in the U.S. state of Kentucky with money from the James Breckenridge Speed Foundation which was created by his children William S. Speed and Olive Speed Sackett to honor J. B. Speed. Until 2003, it was known as the J. B. Speed Scientific School.

The school is colloquially referred to as Speed School or just Speed by students and locals.

Degree programs
The school offers Bachelor of Science, Master of Engineering, Master of Science and Doctor of Philosophy degrees in seven fields:
Chemical Engineering (ChE)
Civil and Environmental Engineering (CEE)
Computer Science and Engineering (CES)
Electrical and Computer Engineering (ECE)
Engineering Management (EM)
Industrial Engineering (IE)
Mechanical Engineering (ME)
Biomedical Engineering (BE)
The school offers Bachelor of Arts degrees in one field:
Computer Science (CS)

Student life
In Fall 2018, the student body consists of 2,546 students (2,038 undergraduate and 508 graduate). The largest departments are ME and CECS, with a little more than 485 and 380 students respectively. In student and faculty opinion, the Speed School is considered to be one of the most rigorous and prestigious programs at the university.

When undergraduate students enter the school, they enter into a 5-year combined Bachelors and Masters program. Most students go to school year-round, in Fall, Spring, and Summer semesters, for a total of 14 semesters. Three of the 14 semesters are for co-op internships, to be done at industry locations, three of the 14 semesters are for the graduate (Masters) program, and the other eight semesters are for the undergraduate (Bachelors) program.

Accreditation
Seven programs in the J. B. Speed School of Engineering at the University of Louisville are accredited by the Engineering Accreditation Commission (EAC) of ABET. These programs result in the award of Master of Engineering degrees in the following disciplines:
Chemical Engineering (ChE)
Civil and Environmental Engineering (CEE)
Computer Engineering and Computer Science (CECS)
Electrical and Computer Engineering (ECE)
Industrial Engineering (IE)
Biomedical Engineering (BE)
Mechanical Engineering (ME)

In addition, the J. B. Speed School of Engineering also offers a B. S. degree in Computer Science that is accredited by the Computer Accreditation Commission (CAC) of ABET.

As of November 2010, all bachelor's degree-level engineering majors are also accredited by ABET.

Facilities
The campus lies almost entirely south of Eastern Parkway on the Belknap Campus (main campus) of the University of Louisville and consists of the following buildings:
 Engineering Graphics building — for the Engineering Graphics department- Demolished in 2013 since the integration of the Engineering Graphics department and the Engineering Fundamentals Department led to the only graphics class offered to be taught in the Duthie Center for Engineering.
 Henry Vogt building — attached to Sackett Hall, used by several departments
Sackett Hall — attached to the Henry Vogt building, used by the Mechanical Engineering department
 J. B. Speed building — houses the Dean's office, Academic Affairs, Admissions, Departments of Engineering Fundamentals, advising offices, and Industrial Engineering departments
 W. S. Speed building — used by Electrical and Computer Engineering, and Civil and Environmental Engineering departments
 R. C. Ernst Hall — used by the Chemical Engineering department
 Lutz Hall — used by Electrical and Computer Engineering, Biomedical Engineering, Chemical Engineering, and Computer Science and Engineering Departments
 John W. Shumaker Research Building - contains a  cleanroom core facility, and nanotechnology and bioengineering research laboratories
 Duthie Center for Engineering - used by the Computer Science and Engineering (CSE) department, along with the Center for Cooperative Education, and a number of classroom facilities used by the Engineering Fundamentals Department.

References

External links
Speed School website
Speed School Student Council
Speed School of Engineering annual Engineering Exposition
Speed School of Engineering - ACM Student Chapter

Educational institutions established in 1924
Engineering schools and colleges in the United States
Engineering universities and colleges in Kentucky
University of Louisville
1924 establishments in Kentucky